In algebra, the ring of polynomial differential forms on the standard n-simplex  is the differential graded algebra:

Varying n, it determines the simplicial commutative dg algebra:

(each  induces the map ).

References 

 Aldridge Bousfield and V. K. A. M. Gugenheim, §1 and §2 of: On PL De Rham Theory and Rational Homotopy Type, Memoirs of the A. M. S., vol. 179, 1976.

External links 
 https://ncatlab.org/nlab/show/differential+forms+on+simplices
 https://mathoverflow.net/questions/220532/polynomial-differential-forms-on-bg

Differential algebra
Ring theory